Holding is a four-part television series based on the debut novel of the same name by Graham Norton. It premiered on ITV on 14 March 2022 and on Virgin Media More in Ireland on 12 April 2022.

Cast

Main
 Conleth Hill as PJ Collins
 Siobhán McSweeney as Bríd Riordan
 Charlene McKenna as Evelyn Ross
 Helen Behan as Abigail Ross
 Amy Conroy as Florence Ross
 Pauline McLynn as Eileen O'Driscoll
 Olwen Fouéré as Kitty Harrington
 Clinton Liberty as Linus Dunne
 Gary Shelford as Anthony Riordan
 Eleanor Tiernan as Susan Hickey
 Sky Yang as Stephen Chen
 Brenda Fricker as Lizzie Meaney

Supporting

Production

Development
It was announced in May 2021 that ITV had commissioned a four-part adaptation of Graham Norton's novel. Dominic Treadwell-Collins and Karen Cogan would write the script for ITV's label Happy Prince with Kathy Burke directing and Martina Niland for Port Pictures.

Casting
Alongside the commission in May, Conleth Hill was cast as the lead character PJ Collins. It was later announced in July 2021 that Siobhán McSweeney, Charlene McKenna, Helen Behan, Pauline McLynn, and Brenda Fricker would star alongside Hill with the likes of Clinton Liberty, Amy Conroy, Olwen Fouéré, Eleanor Tiernan, Gary Shelford, Lochlann Ó Mearáin, Sky Yang, and Demi Isaac Oviawe also having joined the cast.

Filming
Principal photography took place on location in West Cork with support from Screen Ireland, beginning in July 2021 and wrapping in October. Filming locations included Drimoleague and Castletownshend.

References

External links

2022 British television series debuts
2022 British television series endings
2020s British crime drama television series
2020s British television miniseries
2022 Irish television series debuts
2022 Irish television series endings
ITV crime dramas
Television shows based on Irish novels
Television series by ITV Studios
English-language television shows